Capitellum parvicruzae, the lesser Saint Croix skink, is a species of skink found in Saint Croix.

References

parvicruzae
Reptiles described in 2012
Taxa named by Stephen Blair Hedges
Taxa named by Caitlin E. Conn